Julia Borgström (born 9 June 2001) is a Swedish professional racing cyclist, who currently rides for UCI Women's Continental Team . She rode in the women's road race event at the 2020 UCI Road World Championships.

Major results
2022
1st  Youth classification RideLondon Classique
5th Overall Gracia Orlová
Tour de France Femmes
Held  after stage 6

References

External links
 

2001 births
Living people
Swedish female cyclists
Place of birth missing (living people)
21st-century Swedish women
People from Skanör
Sportspeople from Skåne County